Narek Samveli Beglaryan (born 1 September 1985 in Noyemberyan) is a former Armenian football striker, who plays for Alashkert.

Career
Narek started his career with his local club, Mika. Beglaryan became the second best scorer in 2011 season with 11 goals.

1. FC Tatran Prešov
On 25 January 2012, he joined the Corgoň Liga club Tatran Prešov on a half-year contract. He made his first team debut on 3 March 2012, replacing Dávid Guba from the bench after eighty minutes in a 0–1 loss, in a derby against Košice.

Zhetysu
On 12 July 2016, Beglaryan signed for Kazakhstan Premier League side Zhetysu.

External links
1. FC Tatran Prešov profile

References

1985 births
People from Tavush Province
Living people
Armenian footballers
Armenian expatriate footballers
Association football forwards
FC Mika players
Racing Club Beirut players
FC Gandzasar Kapan players
1. FC Tatran Prešov players
Slovak Super Liga players
Kazakhstan Premier League players
Expatriate footballers in Slovakia
Expatriate footballers in Kazakhstan
Expatriate footballers in Lebanon
Armenian expatriate sportspeople in Slovakia
Armenian expatriate sportspeople in Kazakhstan
Armenian expatriate sportspeople in Lebanon
Lebanese Premier League players